Nocardiopsis oceani  is a Gram-positive and aerobic bacterium from the genus of Nocardiopsis which has been isolated from the South China Sea.

References

External links
Type strain of Nocardiopsis oceani at BacDive -  the Bacterial Diversity Metadatabase	

Actinomycetales
Bacteria described in 2015